The Bjørnevatn mine is a large mine in the north of Norway in Finnmark. Bjørnevatn represents one of the largest iron reserves in Norway, having estimated reserves of 565 million tonnes of ore grading 31% iron.

References 

Iron mines in Norway